John Patrick "Joe" Abbott (12 April 1902 in Burnley, England – 1 July 1950) was an international motorcycle speedway rider who rode in the World Championship final in 1937.

Career summary 
Joe began his career with local track Burnley in 1928 before moving onto Preston for two seasons. He then joined the Belle Vue Aces and stayed there until the outbreak of World War II. At Belle Vue he formed a formidable partnership with Frank Charles which they utilised internationally. He made fifteen appearances for England between 1930 and 1939 and qualified for a World Final.

After the war he became captain of the Harringay Racers in 1947 and transferred to the Odsal Boomerangs in Bradford towards the end of the 1947 season.

On 21 June 1949 Joe was riding in live televised meeting at West Ham Stadium against the West Ham Hammers. Joe crashed and suffered serious injury, but in the crowd were dozens of ambulance men from Poplar hospital who rushed him there immediately. The quick actions saved his life.

World Final appearances 
 1937 -  London, Wembley Stadium - 13th - 14pts

Death 
On 1 July 1950 in the National League match for the Boomerangs against West Ham, Joe, who was now 48 years old fell in his second race and was hit by a following rider and was instantly killed. The riders and promoters decided to carry on with the meeting, as they believed Joe would have wished it. Fans left Odsal Stadium unaware that Joe, with nicknames such as 'India-rubber Man', and "Ironman", had died.

Players cigarette cards
Abbott is listed as number 1 of 50 in the 1930s Player's cigarette card collection.

See also
 Rider deaths in motorcycle racing

References

External links
 The Adventures of Dick Case, 'Dusty' Haigh, and Joe Abbott - Christmas 1934

1902 births
1950 deaths
British speedway riders
Harringay Racers riders
Belle Vue Aces riders
English motorcycle racers
Motorcycle racers who died while racing
Sportspeople from Burnley
Sport deaths in England